According to some sources, Bardulia is the ancient name of the territories that composed the primitive Castile in the north of what later became the province of Burgos. The name comes from Varduli, the name of a tribe who, in pre-Roman and Roman times, populated the eastern part of the Cantabrian coast of the Iberian peninsula, primarily in present-day Guipúzcoa. Some assert that the Varduil also encompassed or assimilated the Caristii and Autrigones.

It has been speculated that a possible expansion of the Basque territories—Late Basquisation, an expansion to the Basque Country in the 6th through 8th centuries—occasioned a westward migration of the Varduli to what the documents of the Low Middle Ages call Bardulia.

Bardulia and Castile
The first written mention of Bardulia is a 10th-century chronicle that describes it as a former name for Castile. The Chronicle of Alfonso III, written in Latin, uses the term four times, in various declensions. Similar passages recur in the texts of later chroniclers.

There are two variants of the Chronicle of Alfonso III. Among the passages there are "" ("Bardulia, which is now called Castella") and "" ("the Bardulian Province") where King Ramiro I of Asturias was traveling to take a wife, and where he heard of the death of his predecessor Alfonso II.

In the first half of the 13th century, Lucas de Tuy twice mentions Bardulia, as does Rodrigo Jiménez de Rada, in an allusion to Ramiro, that on the death of Alfonso II, "" ("he stayed some time in Bardulia to take a wife"). In another place Jiménez de Rada closely parallels the Chronicle of Alfonso III: "" ("nobles 
of Bardulia, which is now called Castile").

Addressing the claim that Bardulia was simply a scholarly term, the 20th century medievalist and statesman Claudio Sánchez-Albornoz y Menduiña defends Alfonso III from the charge of a scholarly error in equating Bardulia with early Castile, but his words leave the matter somewhat open: "It is very probable that Alfonso III did not commit a error of erudition in identifying Bardulia with Castile," and that "If there was an error in the identification of Bardulia with Castile, that error propagates from Castile itself in the 9th century, which is hard to reconcile with it being of [later] erudite origin.

Notes

Geographic history of Spain